Alan Roger Moller (February 1, 1950 – June 19, 2014) was an American meteorologist, storm chaser, nature and landscape photographer known for advancing spotter training and bridging operational meteorology (particularly severe storms forecasting) with research.

Early years
Moller was born in Fort Worth, Texas on February 1, 1950, grew up in the South Hills section of Fort Worth, and attended R. L. Paschal High School. He studied meteorology at the University of Oklahoma (OU) where he earned B.S. and M.S. degrees in the late 1960s and early 1970s. He made a career as a forecaster at the National Weather Service (NWS).

Storm prediction pioneer
Moller was influential in developing the national Skywarn storm spotter training program, he produced, appeared in, and provided photography for its training film Tornadoes: A Spotter's Guide (1977) and its training video Storm Watch (1995), and he collaboratively developed the concept of the "integrated warning system". He was influential in developing new spotter training materials in the 1970s that were used nationally and he continued to refine training materials and techniques throughout his career. Moller intensively trained spotters in his NWS office area of responsibility in North Texas as well as around the country by way of frequent speaking engagements. Himself an amateur radio operator, he was enthusiastic at the ground truth information provided via amateur radio.

Moller believed that storm chasing was important in providing field experience for spotter trainers as well for forecasting convective weather. He viewed chasing as an important avenue in providing imagery illustrating storm processes for spotter training and public preparedness. Moller passionately photographed storms and skyscapes, actively shared this imagery, and was also a noted nature and landscape photographer. Moller began chasing as a graduate student of OU and was a participant in the first organized scientific storm chasing projects, such as the NSSL/OU Tornado Intercept Project, in the early 1970s. He was a forecaster for Project VORTEX in 1994–1995.

Moller participated in major pieces of media coverage regarding forecasting storms and storm spotting and chasing. He was an important contributor to Storm Track magazine and wrote or co-wrote dozens of scientific journal articles, conference papers, and monograph chapters. Moller was a fellow of the American Meteorological Society (AMS). The Texas Severe Storms Association (TESSA) made a formal tribute to Moller upon his retirement and established the Alan R. Moller Severe Weather Education and Research Scholarship a few years prior to his death.

Personal life
Moller contracted early-onset Alzheimer's disease and died of complications thereof on June 19, 2014, aged 64. Moller enjoyed drag racing and fast cars, baseball, travel, western art, barbecue, and blues music.

References

External links
 
 Al Moller – The Zen of Weather Forecasting (College of DuPage)
 In Memory of Alan Moller (Facebook tribute page)
 Farewell to a mentor, teacher, and good friend (Jason Jordan)
 

University of Oklahoma alumni
Storm chasers
Amateur radio people
Photographers from Texas
Landscape photographers
Nature photographers
People from Fort Worth, Texas
American meteorologists
National Weather Service people
1950 births
2014 deaths
Neurological disease deaths in Texas
Deaths from Alzheimer's disease
Fellows of the American Meteorological Society